Ndzalama Wildlife Reserve is a 14 000 ha wildlife reserve in the Limpopo province of South Africa.  Situated in the Valley of the Olifants.  Located ± 55 km outside Tzaneen and ± 80 km outside Phalaborwa;  Kruger National Park.  Home to two of the "big five" - Elephant and Leopard and many other antelope, primates, birds etc. 

Protected areas of Limpopo